The Death of Young Bara, Joseph Bara or The Death of Bara is an incomplete 1794 painting by the French artist Jacques-Louis David, now in the musée Calvet in Avignon. Joseph Bara, a young drummer in the army of the French First Republic, was killed by the Vendéens. He became a hero and martyr of the French Revolution and – with The Death of Marat and The Last Moments of Michel Lepeletier – the painting formed part of a series by David showing such martyrs. There is also an anonymous contemporary copy dating to 1794, now in the Palais des Beaux-Arts de Lille and exhibited at the Musée de la Révolution française.

Bibliography
La Mort de Bara, foundation du muséum Calvet, Avignon, 1989

1794 paintings
Paintings by Jacques-Louis David
Unfinished paintings
Paintings about death